Central Research Institute of Culture and History (Chinese: 中央文史研究馆) is an institute founded by the Chinese Communist Party and the Chinese government for senior intellects with a united front and honorary purposes. Premier of the State Council appoints its presidents, vice presidents, and fellows, and they are all senior scholars, celebrities, and specialists.

History
The founding of Central Research Institute of Culture and History was advocated by Mao Zedong. On the eve of liberation of Beijing, Mao Zedong told his mentor, Fu Dingyi, in Shijiazhuang that CCP would have arrangement for senior indigent scholars and would found an institute for them. On December 2, 1949, in a letter to Liu Yazi, Mao mentioned again that "the issue of institute of culture and history has been assigned to premier Zhou Enlai, and will be soon settled". Later, Mao and Zhou asked Fu Dingyi, Liu Yazi, Zhang Shizhao among others to join the planning work, and also appointed Lin Boqu and Qi Yanming to be in charge of the founding project. On July 29, 1951, the vice premier of the State Council, Dong Biwu, announced the "founding of Research Institute of Cultural and History of the State Council". Fu Dingyi became the first president, and Ye Gongchuo, Liu Yazi and Zhang Shizhao were the vice president. After the death of Fu Dingyi in 1958, Zhang Shizhao became the second president, and more elite scholars, Xu Senyu, Chen Yinke, Shen Yinmo, Xing Zanting, Xie Wuliang and Shang Yanliu were vice presidents. In 1974, Yang Dongchun was the third president. Ye Shengtao succeeded as the fourth president in 1980. Xiao Qian was the fifth president since 1989. And the sixth president was Qigong starting from 1999. Since 1986, Xiao Qian, Wu Kong, Qigong, Wang Chuguang and Yuan Xingpei have served as vice president. The current president is Yuan Xingpei. There are currently 29 fellows in the institute, with average age of 79.2.

See also

External links 
 Official website of Central Research Institute of Culture and History

 
Research institutes in China
Schools and research institutes of the Chinese Communist Party
Research institutes established in 1951
1951 establishments in China